Prolasius is a genus of ants in the subfamily Formicinae.  Of the genus' 19 species, 18 are known from Australia (one of which is also found in Papua New Guinea) and one from New Zealand. They nest in soil under rocks or logs, sometimes in trees.

Species

 Prolasius abruptus Clark, 1934
 Prolasius advenus (Smith, F., 1862)
 Prolasius antennatus McAreavey, 1947
 Prolasius bruneus McAreavey, 1947
 Prolasius clarki McAreavey, 1947
 Prolasius convexus McAreavey, 1947
 Prolasius depressiceps (Emery, 1914)
 Prolasius flavicornis Clark, 1934
 Prolasius formicoides (Forel, 1902)
 Prolasius hellenae McAreavey, 1947
 Prolasius hemiflavus Clark, 1934
 Prolasius mjoebergella (Forel, 1916)
 Prolasius nitidissimus (André, 1896)
 Prolasius pallidus Clark, 1934
 Prolasius quadratus McAreavey, 1947
 Prolasius reticulatus McAreavey, 1947
 Prolasius robustus McAreavey, 1947
 Prolasius wheeleri McAreavey, 1947
 Prolasius wilsoni McAreavey, 1947

References

External links

Formicinae
Ant genera